is a trolleybus and cable car station in Tateyama, Nakaniikawa District, Toyama Prefecture, Japan.

Lines
Tateyama Kurobe Kankō
Tateyama Tunnel Trolley Bus (Tateyama Kurobe Alpine Route)
Tateyama Ropeway (Tateyama Kurobe Alpine Route)

Adjacent stations

References 

Railway stations in Toyama Prefecture
Tateyama, Toyama